Thomas Stuart Montgomery (1917-1970) was an American architect working in Washington D.C. and Arizona during the middle 20th century. His offices were located in Old Town Scottsdale and later in downtown Tempe. He is known for designing Saint Barnabas On The Desert Episcopal Church in Paradise Valley.

Life and career 
Montgomery was born in 1917. Prior to coming to Arizona, Montgomery was associated with Ring Engineering Co., a Washington-based firm that specialized in multi-story high rise buildings. He served as principal architect for the design of the 12-story Ring Building in Washington. While working for the Ring from he was involved in the design of mini high-rise and garden type apartments in Washington and many other eastern cities. In 1948 he and his family moved to Arizona and settled in Tempe. He established his practice in 1954 and in 1957 moved it from Scottsdale to Tempe. He was commissioned to design Saint Barnabas On The Desert Episcopal Church, completed in 1961. Montgomery continued to design buildings throughout Arizona until his death in 1970.

Structures 
Ring Engineering Co.

1941 Dorchester House, Washington D.C.
1946 Ring Building, Washington D.C.
1940s Carlyn Apartment, Washington D.C.

Arizona

1951 Montgomery residence, Tempe
1955-1958 Craftsman Court (Kiva Plaza) Old Town Scottsdale
 1955 Glassart Studio, Old Town Scottsdale (now FnB Restaurant)
1955-1958 Saint Augustine's Episcopal Church, Tempe
1957-1960 Our Lady of Mount Carmel, Tempe
 1958 Heard Museum gallery and classroom buildings, Phoenix
1958 Loma Vista Apartments, Scottsdale
c.1958 Telephone Exchange Building, Sedona
1959 Westinghouse Electric Corporation manufacturing building, Phoenix
1960 Saint Paul's Episcopal Church, Phoenix
 1960-1961 Saint Barnabas On The Desert Episcopal Church, Paradise Valley
 1962 Delta Sigma Phi House, Arizona State University, Tempe (Demolished)
 1962 First Church of Christ Scientist, Scottsdale
 1962 Saint Paul's Episcopal Church, Yuma
 1964 Orangewood Presbyterian Church, Phoenix
 1964 Sanctuary addition to Scottsdale United Methodist Church
 1964 Parish Hall addition to St Barnabas On The Desert
 1965 Physical Education East, Arizona State University, Tempe
1965 Church of the Master Presbyterian, Mesa
c.1965 Saint Peter's Lutheran Church, Mesa
 1966 Prince of Peace Lutheran Church, Phoenix
1966 Trinity Methodist Church, Phoenix
1966 Glendale Bath Houses, Glendale
1967 Scottsdale Baptist Church, Scottsdale (now New Life Community Church)
1969 Tempe Cultural Center (site plan)
 1970 expansion to Memorial Union, Arizona State University Tempe

References 

1917 births
1970 deaths
20th-century American architects
Architects from Arizona
Modernist architects